The Reed-Dossey House, in Brownsville, Kentucky, is a historic house built around 1890.  It was listed on the National Register of Historic Places in 1986.

It is a balloon-frame house with a two-story T-plan, plus a one-story wing.

It was deemed notable "as an unusually large and intact example of vernacular late Victorian architecture in a small town in western Kentucky" with well-preserved interior and exterior details.

The house was built by/for entrepreneur J.P. Reed, who was "reputedly connected with the steamboat traffic on the Green River" and it is believed that Reed intended for the house to be a hotel or boarding house.  The house was later operated by the Dossey family as a boarding house;  Miss Tandie Mclntyre, a local schoolteacher was a notable boarder.

References

National Register of Historic Places in Edmonson County, Kentucky
Victorian architecture in Kentucky
Residential buildings completed in 1890
Boarding houses
1890 establishments in Kentucky